Isabel Wolff is a British novelist in the Chick Lit genre.  She was born in Warwickshire, United Kingdom. She graduated from Cambridge University with a Bachelor of Science in English.  She currently lives in Islington, London and has a home on the Roseland Peninsula.  Aside from being a novelist, Wolff has worked as a radio producer and reporter for the BBC World Service.

Work 
Wolff's first novel, The Trials of Tiffany Trott, was born in 1997 when the London Daily Telegraph asked her to write a comic column. Trott's persona is as British working-girl. HarperCollins commissioned Wolff to turn the column into a book.

Her 2009 book, A Vintage Affair, was an Amazon.co.uk 'Best of the Year' title that year.  The same book was also on the short list for the 2011 American Library Association's The Reading List for Women Fiction. A Vintage Affair is also her first novel that reached a wider readership, including being published for the United States book market.

Kirkus Reviews wrote that in The Very Picture of You (2011), Wolff handled multiple plotlines, balancing the stories of "betrayal, deception and remorse" told in the novel in a skillful manner.

Wolff's novel, Ghostwritten (2014), deals with the largely unknown issue of civilians from South East Asia, many of them women and children, who were sent to live in concentration camps run by the Japanese during World War II. The story is very much about "childhood traumas," such as losing a sibling.

Publications 
 The Trials of Tiffany Trott, Onyx (New York, NY), 1998 
 The Making of Minty Malone, Onyx (New York, NY), 1999 
 Out of the Blue, HarperCollins (London, England), 2001, Red Dress Ink (New York, NY), 2003 
 Rescuing Rose, HarperCollins (London, England), 2002 
 Behaving Badly, HarperCollins (London, England), 2003 
 A Question of Love, HarperCollins (London, England), 2005 
 Forget Me Not, HarperCollins (New York, NY), 2007 
 A Vintage Affair, Bantam Books (New York, NY), 2009 
 The Very Picture of You, Bantam Books (New York, NY), 2011 
 Ghostwritten (in UK) or Shadows Over Paradise (in US), HarperCollins (London, England), 2014

References

Women's fiction
English women novelists
British chick lit writers
Living people
Writers from London
Year of birth missing (living people)
Place of birth missing (living people)
Alumni of the University of Cambridge